Abramsky or Abramski is a variation of a patronymic surname meaning "son of Abram", the Biblical figure. The name is most prevalent among Jews. Notable people with the surname include:

 Alexander Abramsky (1898–1985), Russian composer
 Chimen Abramsky (1916–2010), English professor of Jewish studies
 Jenny Abramsky (born 1946), British radio personality
 Nili Abramski (born 1970), Israeli long-distance runner
 Samson Abramsky (born 1953), British computer scientist
 Sasha Abramsky (born 1972), British journalist and author
 Yehezkel Abramsky (1886–1976), British Orthodox rabbi

References 

Jewish surnames
Patronymic surnames